FlyCongo was an airline based in the Democratic Republic of the Congo. It was formed due to the suspension of Hewa Bora Airways after a series of fatal accidents. The new airline aimed to show a huge improvement in air safety in the Democratic Republic of the Congo. After only 6 months in operation the company merged with Compagnie Africaine d'Aviation (CAA) in October, 2012.  The company slogan was Like Never Before!

History 
Founded in 2012 from the remains of Hewa Bora Airways, FlyCongo commenced operations on 24 March 2012 with a McDonnell Douglas MD-82 aircraft.

On 27 March 2012, FlyCongo announced that they will be destroying six of the previous aircraft operated by Hewa Bora Airways in a bid to boost confidence in the new airline. The aircraft will be five Boeing 727s and one of another unknown type.

In 2012 CAA formed a commercial and strategic alliance with rival FlyCongo which led to consolidation into a single brand, flyCAA, in October 2012.

Destinations 
FlyCongo served the following destinations (as of April 2012):

Fleet 
The FlyCongo fleet was made of the following aircraft (as of April 2014):

See also		
 Transport in the Democratic Republic of the Congo

References

External links
 FlyCongo 

Defunct airlines of the Democratic Republic of the Congo
Airlines established in 1992
Companies based in Kinshasa